The Blizzard of Ozz Tour was the debut concert tour as a solo artist by British vocalist Ozzy Osbourne, who had been fired from the English group Black Sabbath a year prior. The tour started on September 12, 1980 and concluded on September 13, 1981.

Overview

Background
Ozzy Osbourne was fired from Black Sabbath on April 27, 1979. Guitarist Randy Rhoads from Quiet Riot was hired in late November 1979. Former Rainbow bassist Bob Daisley was hired on November 14, 1979. The first song that Ozzy, Rhoads, and Daisley wrote together was "Goodbye to Romance." Former-Uriah Heep drummer Lee Kerslake was hired in March 1980. The band then went to Ridge Farm Studios in Rusper to record the debut album, Blizzard of Ozz, from March 22 to April 19, 1980.

Europe leg
In August 1980, the band began rehearsing at Shepperton Studios in Shepperton, England for the "Blizzard of Ozz Tour." Don Airey, who had been hired to perform keyboards and synthesizers on "Mr. Crowley", "Goodbye to Romance" and "Revelation Mother Earth", could not tour with Ozzy since he had already signed a contract to tour with Rainbow, so the band hired Lindsay Bridgwater. The band performed two secret warm-up gigs billed as "The Law" in September at Norbreck Castle Nightclub in Blackpool on September 3 and at West Runton Pavilion on September 5. The band kicked off its opening night of the tour in front of a sold-out crowd at the Glasgow Apollo on September 12.

The 70s Welsh heavy metal band Budgie would open for Ozzy throughout the 1980 European leg. On September 20, Blizzard of Ozz was released in the United Kingdom and was a success. "Crazy Train" and "Mr Crowley" were released as singles. "Goodbye to Romance", "I Don't Know" and "Suicide Solution" also received radio airplay. On October 2, the band played at The Gamount Theatre in Southampton where the recordings of "Goodbye to Romance" and "No Bone Movies" would appear on the live Tribute album, released on March 19, 1987. The live recordings of "Mr. Crowley" and "Suicide Solution" would be released on the Mr. Crowley Live EP.

The band regrouped back at Ridge Farm to record Diary of a Madman between February and March 1981. Tensions between Ozzy/Sharon and Daisley/Kerslake over contract issues regarding their names, money, credit, and royalties got worse, which led to Sharon firing Daisley and Kerslake in March 1981. Ozzy, Sharon and Rhoads went back to the United States to look for a new drummer and bassist.

North America leg
In March 1981, former-Black Oak Arkansas, Pat Travers and Gary Moore drummer, Tommy Aldridge, and former-Quiet Riot bassist, Rudy Sarzo, were hired. Blizzard of Ozz was released in the United States and Canada on March 27, 1981 and it became a success. "Crazy Train" and "Mr. Crowley" were released as singles and "Goodbye to Romance", "I Don't Know" and "Suicide Solution" received radio airplay. The album eventually went platinum.

In April, the band began rehearsals for the North America leg at Swing Auditorium in San Bernardino, California. On April 22, the band kicked off the North America leg of the tour at Towson Arena in Towson, Maryland in front of a sold-out crowd. Throughout the first half of the North American leg of the tour, the band was supported by English heavy metal band Motörhead. Other bands would be added, such as Joe Perry, The Outlaws and Mountain. On April 28, the band went to Channel 31(WUHF) TV Studios in Rochester, New York to film a live performance of "I Don't Know", "Suicide Solution", "Mr. Crowley" and "Crazy Train", which were broadcast on the After Hours TV show as live promo-videos.

On May 11, the live recording of the Cleveland Music Hall performance was broadcast live over the local rock radio station and became as the first 13 tracks on the live Tribute album. On July 4, the band performed as the special guests in front of their biggest crowd at Bill Graham's Day on the Green Festival where they were supported by "415" (the opener) and Loverboy while Pat Travers, Blue Öyster Cult and Heart performed afterwards.

On July 28, the Montreal performance was recorded live and broadcast on the "King Biscuit Flower Hour" radio show. The guitar solo from the song "Suicide Solution" from this performance was dubbed into the Cleveland recording of "Suicide Solution" for the Tribute album. "Flying High Again" and "I Don't Know" from the Montreal performance were included on the bonus album Ozzy Live for the 2011 Diary Of A Madman Deluxe 30th Anniversary Legacy Edition album release. The band went back to England to perform at Vale Park in Burslem, Stoke for the "Heavy Metal Holocaust Festival." The band went back to finish the Blizzard of Ozz Tour in the United States with English hard rock band Def Leppard. The band ended the tour at Peabody Auditorium in Daytona Beach, Florida on September 13, 1981.

Personnel

Europe
 Ozzy Osbourne – vocals
 Randy Rhoads – guitar
 Bob Daisley – bass
 Lee Kerslake – drums
 Lindsay Bridgwater – keyboards

North America
 Ozzy Osbourne – vocals
 Randy Rhoads – guitar
 Rudy Sarzo – bass
 Tommy Aldridge – drums
 Lindsay Bridgwater – keyboards

Setlists

Europe
"O Fortuna" (Carl Orff song) [Audio introduction]
"I Don't Know"
"You Lookin' at Me Lookin' at You"
"Crazy Train"
"Goodbye to Romance"
"No Bone Movies"
"Mr Crowley"
"Revelation Mother Earth"
"Suicide Solution"
Randy Rhoads guitar solo
Lee Kerslake drum solo
"Iron Man" (Black Sabbath cover)
"Children of the Grave" (Black Sabbath cover)
"Steal Away the Night"
"Paranoid" (Black Sabbath cover) [encore]

North America
"O Fortuna" ("Carl Orff" Song) [Audio Intro]
"I Don't Know"
"Crazy Train"
"Believer"
"Mr Crowley"
"Flying High Again"
"Revelation Mother Earth"
"Steal Away the Night"
Tommy Aldridge drum solo
"No Bone Movies"
"Suicide Solution" [and "Randy Rhoads guitar solo]
"Iron Man" (Black Sabbath cover)
"Children of the Grave" (Black Sabbath covers)
"Paranoid" (Black Sabbath cover) [encore]

Tour dates

References

Ozzy Osbourne concert tours
1980 concert tours
1981 concert tours